The 1972–73 Irish Cup was the 93rd edition of the premier knock-out cup competition in Northern Irish football. 

Glentoran won the cup for the 9th time, defeating Linfield 3–2 in the final at Windsor Park.

The holders Coleraine were eliminated in the semi-finals by Linfield.

Results

First round

|}

Replay

|}

Quarter-finals

|}

Replay

|}

Semi-finals

|}

Final

References

External links
The Rec.Sport.Soccer Statistics Foundation - Northern Ireland - Cup Finals

Irish Cup seasons
1972–73 in Northern Ireland association football
1972–73 domestic association football cups